Soleri is an Italian surname. Notable people with the surname include:

 Edoardo Soleri (born 1997), Italian footballer
 Giuseppe Soleri (born 1982), Italian television actor
 Marcello Soleri (1882–1945), Italian politician
 Paolo Soleri (1919–2013), Italian architect

Italian-language surnames